Congophiloscia saothomensis is a species of crustacean isopods, in the family Philosciidae. The species was named by Helmut Schmalfuss and Franco Ferrara in 1978. The species is endemic to São Tomé and Príncipe.

References

Woodlice
Invertebrates of São Tomé and Príncipe
Endemic fauna of São Tomé and Príncipe
Crustaceans described in 1978